James Prendergast may refer to:
 James Prendergast (Canadian politician) (1858–1945), judge and politician in western Canada
 James Prendergast (judge) (1826–1921), third Chief Justice of New Zealand
 James F. Prendergast (1917–1985), member of the Pennsylvania House of Representatives
 James Luke Prendergast (1800–1895), merchant and political figure in Newfoundland
 James Prendergast, early Chautauqua County settler, Jamestown, New York was named in his honour